Sebastiano Esposito (born 2 July 2002) is an Italian professional footballer who plays as a forward for  club Bari, on loan from Inter Milan.

Club career

Inter Milan
Esposito made his professional debut for Inter Milan at 16 years old, on 14 March 2019, in the second leg of Europa League match against Eintracht Frankfurt, coming in as a substitute for Borja Valero in the 73rd minute. He became the youngest player ever to feature in a European competition match for the club.

The following season, on 23 October 2019 he made his debut in Champions League replacing Romelu Lukaku in the group stage match against Borussia Dortmund, and becoming the first player born in 2002 and the second youngest ever for the club to feature in a Champions League/European Cup match, after Giuseppe Bergomi. On 26 October he made his Serie A debut, aged 17, coming as a substitute for Lautaro Martínez in a home match against Parma in San Siro. On 21 December 2019, Esposito scored his first goal for Inter, on his full debut, from a penalty in a 4–0 win at home against Genoa. On 18 June 2020, he was nominated for the Golden Boy award.

On 25 September 2020 he joined SPAL on loan.

On 15 January 2021, Esposito joined Venezia on loan.

2021–22 season: Loan to FC Basel
On 13 July 2021, he was loaned to Swiss club FC Basel, with an option to buy. Basel confirmed the loan deal on the same day and Esposito joined Basel's first team for their 2021–22 season under head coach Patrick Rahmen. After playing in one test game Esposito played his debut for his new club in the second qualifying round of the 2021–22 UEFA Europa Conference League, a home game in the St. Jakob-Park on 22 July 2021 as Basel won 3–0 against Partizani Tirana. Three days later, on 25 July, Esposito made his Swiss Super League debut for Basel against Grasshoppers and scored his first goal for the club in the same game as they recorded 2–0 victory.

At the end of the season Basel decided not to pull the purchase option. During his time with the club, Esposito played a total of 39 games for Basel scoring a total of 9 goals. 23 of these games were in the Swiss Super League, one in the Swiss Cup, ten in the UEFA Europa Conference League and five were friendly games. He scored 6 goals in the domestic league, one in the Conference League and the other two were scored during the test games.

2022–23 season: Loans to Anderlecht and Bari
On 4 July 2022, Esposito joined Belgian club Anderlecht on loan. On 31 January 2023, Esposito moved on a new loan to Bari in Serie B.

International career
He took part in the 2019 UEFA European Under-17 Championship, reaching the final of the tournament.

He made his debut with the Italy U21 on 3 September 2020, in a friendly match won 2–1 against Slovenia.

Personal life
He is the younger brother of midfielder Salvatore Esposito.

Career statistics

Club

Honours
Inter Milan
UEFA Europa League runner-up: 2019–20

Italy U17
UEFA European Under-17 Championship runner-up: 2019

Individual
UEFA European Under-17 Championship Team of the Tournament: 2019

References

External links
 
 

2002 births
Living people
People from Castellammare di Stabia
Footballers from Campania
Italian footballers
Association football forwards
Italy youth international footballers
Italy under-21 international footballers
Inter Milan players
S.P.A.L. players
Venezia F.C. players
FC Basel players
R.S.C. Anderlecht players
S.S.C. Bari players
Serie A players
Swiss Super League players
Belgian Pro League players
Italian expatriate footballers
Italian expatriate sportspeople in Switzerland
Expatriate footballers in Switzerland
Italian expatriate sportspeople in Belgium
Expatriate footballers in Belgium